The 1900–01 Michigan State Spartans men's basketball team represented Michigan State University for the 1900–01 college men's basketball season. The head coach was George Denman coaching the team his first season. The Spartans team captain was Charles Blanchard.

Schedule

|-

References

Michigan State Spartans men's basketball seasons
Michigan State
Michigan State|Michigan
Michigan State|Michigan